Argol is a commune in the Finistère department and administrative region of Brittany in north-western France.

Population
In French the inhabitants of Argol are known as Argoliens.

See also
Communes of the Finistère department
Parc naturel régional d'Armorique
Argol Parish close

References

External links

 
Official website
 Mayors of Finistère Association ;

Communes of Finistère